Crossing the Tracks is the debut album by American banjoist Béla Fleck, released in 1979.

Reception
"Excellent mix between bluegrass and jazz, original songs and traditional pieces, all done with a bright and joyful élan, this album is a perfect springboard to his coming solo efforts."

Track listing 
 "Dear Old Dixie" (Lester Flatt, Earl Scruggs) – 2:39
 "Inman Square" (Fleck) – 4:00
 "Texas Barbeque" (Fleck) – 3:59
 "Growling Old Man and the Grumbling Old Woman" (Traditional; arranged by Fleck) – 1:41
 "Spain" (Joaquín Rodrigo; arranged by Chick Corea) – 7:12
 "Crossing the Tracks" (Fleck) – 3:38
 "Spring Thaw" (Fleck) – 2:27
 "How Can You Face Me Now" (lyrics: Andy Razaf; music: Fats Waller) – 4:54
 "Twilight" (Fleck) – 2:01
 "Frosty Morning" (Traditional; arranged by Fleck) – 2:58
 "I Ain't Gonna Work Tomorrow" (Traditional; arranged by Fleck) – 2:26

Personnel 
 Béla Fleck – banjo, arrangements
 Bob Applebaum – mandolin
 Russ Barenberg – guitar
 Sam Bush – fiddle
 Mark Schatz – bass
with:
 Jerry Douglas – dobro on "Dear Old Dixie" and "Spain"
 Pat Enright – vocals on "How Can You Face Me Now" and "Ain't Gonna Work Tomorrow"
Randy Sabien - fiddle on "Twilight"

References 

1979 debut albums
Béla Fleck albums
Rounder Records albums